Theodoor Jacobus Boks (15 August 1893, in Elst – 18 July 1961, in Hilversum?) was a Dutch mathematician working on analysis.

Boks obtained his PhD cum laude at Utrecht University in 1921 with the dissertation "Sur les rapports entre les méthodes d'intégration de Riemann et de Lebesgue".

References

1893 births
1961 deaths
Year of death uncertain
Dutch mathematicians
Utrecht University alumni
People from Rhenen